R Mall is a mall situated in Mulund, a suburb of Mumbai, India was opened in 2003. Developed by Runwal Developers Pvt. The site includes a 7 level car parking facility. It is the second oldest mall in Mumbai, and the oldest in Mumbai Suburban district.

References

External links
R Mall website

Shopping malls in Mumbai
Mulund
Shopping malls established in 2003
2003 establishments in Maharashtra